The 2005 BA-CA-TennisTrophy was a men's tennis tournament played on indoor hard courts. It was the 31st edition of the event known that year as the BA-CA-TennisTrophy, and was part of the International Series Gold of the 2005 ATP Tour. It took place at the Wiener Stadthalle in Vienna, Austria, from 10 October until 16 October 2005. Fourth-seeded Ivan Ljubičić won the singles title.

Finals

Singles

 Ivan Ljubičić defeated  Juan Carlos Ferrero, 6–2, 6–4, 7–6(7–5)
It was Ivan Ljubičić's 2nd title of the year, and his 3rd overall.

Doubles

 Mark Knowles /  Daniel Nestor defeated  Jonathan Erlich /  Andy Ram, 5–3, 5–4(7–4)

References

External links
 Official website
 ATP tournament profile

BA-CA-TennisTrophy
Vienna Open
2005 in Austrian tennis